Bezvěrov is a municipality and village in Plzeň-North District in the Plzeň Region of the Czech Republic. It has about 700 inhabitants.

Administrative parts
Villages of Buč, Chudeč, Dolní Jamné, Krašov, Nová Víska, Potok, Služetín, Světec, Vlkošov and Žernovník are administrative parts of Bezvěrov.

References

Villages in Plzeň-North District